Astrobrachion constrictum is a basket star in the family Euryalidae.

Description
The genus is characterised by the lateral arm plates being separated by small ventral plates. The colour is variable, ranging from yellowish-white to red, and the arms have transverse banding. Astrobrachion adhaerens, the only other species in the genus, is smaller and has longitudinal stripes on the arms.

Distribution
These depths are too deep for most scuba divers, which makes it difficult to study these basket stars. However, in the Fiordland in the south-western part of the South Island of New Zealand, unique conditions allow them and their black coral hosts to live in shallower waters where they are within the range of divers and more readily studied.

Ecology

Black corals in the genus Antipathella host A. constrictum in a mutualistic association that seems to be a long-lasting arrangement: the basket stars coil their arms around the coral twigs and remain in the same locality for long periods, and possibly for life. The basket star has been found in a number of locations around New Zealand on the continental shelf but has never been found living freely, or living anywhere except in association with a black coral colony. The basket stars feed at night, uncoiling their arms from the coral and catching organic particles floating past. They also brush their arms against the coral surface and are probably feeding on detritus and any epizoic organisms that settle there. They are slow-growing, reaching their maximum size at approximately eight years of age.

References

Euryalidae
Animals described in 1900
Fauna of the Pacific Ocean